Heinz Eberhard Strüning (2 May 1896 – 11 March 1986) was a German painter, graphic artist and pastel painter.

Life 
Born in Aplerbeck, Strüning studied at the Dresden Academy of Fine Arts from 1922 to 1924 and at the Kunsthochschule Kassel from 1925 to 1926. From 1927, he was a resident of Leipzig and from 1937 until his death he lived in Machern (Saxony). From 1947 to 1951 he taught as a lecturer at the Hochschule für Grafik und Buchkunst Leipzig and since then he worked as a freelance artist in Machern. Among others, he was a teacher of Gerhard Eichhorn. An increasing eye complaint led to blindness in 1984. Strüning once said about himself: "I create from the full, because I am filled to the top with what I want to create. There is only one law for me: to create until the last, that is what I live for. That is my artistic postulate, my inner law.

Strüning died in Machern at the age of 89.

Work 
The Leipzig University Custody published a catalogue of his works in 1986. Many of them are university-owned, such as the painting "Swans", charcoal drawing over pastels. A work called "Trees" by Strüning has been hanging in the mayor's room of the Machern town hall since 1997. Another work is "Dorfstraße in Machern", pastel, created in 1950.

Exhibitions

Individual exhibitions 
 1948: Halle (Saale)
 1956: in der Galerie Henning in Halle (Saale)
 1958: im Museum der bildenden Künste in Leipzig
 1976: bis 1986 Leipzig, ferner Dresden, Altenburg und Ahrenshoop

Participation in exhibitions 
 1949 and 1972: Deutsche Kunstausstellung bzw. Kunstausstellung der DDR
 from 1972: regelmäßige Teilnahme an der Bezirkskunstausstellung Leipzig

Further reading

References

External links 
 

20th-century German painters
20th-century German male artists
German etchers
1896 births
1986 deaths
Artists from Dortmund